State Trunk Highway 163 (often called Highway 163, STH-163 or WIS 163) was a state highway in the U.S. state of Wisconsin. It ran north–south between Mishicot and Luxemburg. The road was turned over to county control in 1999, and it is now designated as County Trunk Highway B (CTH-B) in Manitowoc County and CTH-AB in Kewaunee County.

Route description
At its latest routing, WIS 163 began to travel northward from WIS 147 in Mishicot. Going past the Manitowoc–Kewaunee county line, it intersected WIS 29 near Ellisville. Continuing farther north, the highway ended at WIS 54 in Luxembourg.

History
Initially, in 1923, WIS 163 was formed to travel from WIS 17 (now WIS 42) in Two Rivers to WIS 54 in Luxembourg. In 1935, WIS 147 extended southeast from Mishicot to Two Rivers, causing WIS 163 to be removed southeast of Mishicot. In 1970, WIS 163 was straightened west of Tisch Mills. In 1999, WIS 163 was decommissioned in favor of transferring this route to local control (replaced by CTH-B in Manitowoc County and CTH-A and AB in Kewaunee County). The route number has not been used ever since.

Major intersections

See also

References

163
Transportation in Manitowoc County, Wisconsin
Transportation in Kewaunee County, Wisconsin